Church of Ireland Hockey Club, also referred to as Cork Church of Ireland or Cork C of I, is a field hockey club based at the Garryduff Sports Centre, in Rochestown, Cork, Ireland. The club is the field hockey club of the Incorporated Church of Ireland Cork Young Men's Association (ICICYMA) and is closely associated with the Church of Ireland diocese of Cork, Cloyne and Ross. In 2008–09 Cork Church of Ireland were founder members of both the Men's Irish Hockey League and the Women's Irish Hockey League. The club's senior men's team also enters the Men's Irish Senior Cup. The men's reserve team plays in the Men's Irish Junior Cup. The club's women's teams have been finalists in both the Women's Irish Senior Cup and the Women's Irish Junior Cup. Cork Church of Ireland was one of the first teams to represent Ireland in Europe when they played in the 1970 EuroHockey Club Champions Cup. Cork Church of Ireland also fields various men's and women's teams in junior, senior and veterans leagues and cup competitions affiliated to Munster Hockey.

Men's section

Men's Irish Senior Cup
Cork Church of Ireland won the Men's Irish Senior Cup for the first time in 1966–67. They subsequently won the cup three seasons in a row.

Notes

Men's Irish Hockey League
In 2008–09 Cork Church of Ireland were founder members of the Men's Irish Hockey League. At the end of the 2018–19 season, Cork Church of Ireland lost a promotion/relegation playoff against UCD. As a result,  Cork Church of Ireland will play in Division 2 and the Munster Division One League in 2019-20.

Men's Irish Junior Cup
Cork Church of Ireland won the Men's Irish Junior Cup for the first time in 1967–68.

Women's section
Cork Church of Ireland have been finalists in both the Women's Irish Senior Cup and the Women's Irish Junior Cup. In 2008–09 they were also founder members of the Women's Irish Hockey League. During the 2010s they have won the Women's Irish Hockey Trophy on three occasions. They play in Munster Division One.

Women's Irish Senior Cup

Women's Irish Junior Cup

Women's Irish Hockey Trophy

Cork Church of Ireland in Europe
Cork Church of Ireland was one of the first teams to represent Ireland in Europe. After winning both the 1968–69 Men's Irish Senior Cup and the 1968–69 British Club Championship, Cork Church of Ireland were invited to play in the 1970 EuroHockey Club Champions Cup.

Notable players

Men's internationals
 
 Jonny Bruton
 Karl Burns
 David Hobbs
 John Jermyn
 Mark Ruddle
 Kevin O'Dea

Honours

Men
British Club Championship
Winners: 1967–68, 1968–69: 2 
Men's Irish Senior Cup
Winners: 1966–67, 1967–68, 1968–69, 1998–99 : 4
Runners Up: 1947–48, 1963–64, 1970–71, 1972–73, 1973–74, 2014–15: 6
Irish Junior Cup
Winners: 1967–68, 1983–84, 1992–93, 2008–09, 2015–16, 2016–17: 6
Runners Up: 1970–71, 1977–78: 2

Women
Women's Irish Senior Cup
Runners Up: 1977–78
Women's Irish Junior Cup
Runners Up: 1998–99
Women's Irish Hockey Trophy
Winners: 2013–14, 2014–15, 2018–19: 3

References

External links
 Cork Church of Ireland on Facebook
  Cork Church of Ireland on Twitter

Men's Irish Hockey League teams
Women's Irish Hockey League teams
Sports clubs in County Cork
Hockey